An election to Warwickshire County Council took place on 2 May 2013 as part of the 2013 United Kingdom local elections. 62 councillors were elected from 56 electoral divisions, which returned either one or two county councillors each by first-past-the-post voting for a four-year term of office. The electoral divisions were the same as those used at the previous election in 2009. The election saw the Conservative Party lose overall control of the council.

All locally registered electors (British, Irish, Commonwealth and European Union citizens) who were aged 18 or over on Thursday 2 May 2013 were entitled to vote in the local elections. Those who were temporarily away from their ordinary address (for example, away working, on holiday, in student accommodation or in hospital) were also entitled to vote in the local elections, although those who had moved abroad and registered as overseas electors cannot vote in the local elections. It is possible to register to vote at more than one address (such as a university student who had a term-time address and lives at home during holidays) at the discretion of the local Electoral Register Office, but it remains an offence to vote more than once in the same local government election.

Summary
The Conservative Party lost overall control of the council, but remained the largest party. Council leader Alan Farnell lost his seat to Keith Kondakor of the Green Party, who won their first two county council seats at this election. The Stratford First Independents gained one seat, and an independent candidate gained another. The Labour Party achieved a net gain of 12 seats and the Liberal Democrats lost three, losing their position as the second largest party on the council. The next election is scheduled for 4 May 2017.

Results

|}

Candidates
The parties with candidates who contested all 62 seats were the Conservative, Labour and Green parties. Liberal Democrats contested 36 divisions. Similarly, UKIP and TUSC stood 22 candidates each. The BNP fielded eight candidates and the English Democrats had one candidate. There were seven independent candidates, three candidates from the Stratford First Independent party, and one candidate from the Whitnash Residents Association.

Results by District
Warwickshire County Council is split into 59 divisions. These are grouped into five districts, each of which has between 8 and 15 division

North Warwickshire
North Warwickshire had 8 seats.  The Conservatives held three (Arley, Coleshill, Water Orton), while Labour held two (Baddesley Ensor, Kingsbury) and took three from the Conservatives (Atherstone, Hartshill, Polesworth).

Nuneaton and Bedworth
In this large area the Conservatives held two seats (Nuneaton St Nicholas, Nuneaton Whitestone). Labour held six seats (Bede, Bedworth West, Nuneaton Abbey, Nuneaton Camp Hill, Nuneaton Wem Brook, Poplar) and gained five from the Conservatives (both Arbury and Stockingford seats, Bedworth North, Bulkington, Nuneaton Galley Common). The Green Party gained one seat from the Conservatives (Nuneaton Weddington).

Rugby
The Conservatives held five (Admirals, Earl Craven, Fosse, both seats in Caldecott), the Liberal Democrats held two (Eastlands and Hillmorton x 2), Labour gained three seats from the Conservatives (Lawford and New Bilton, both seats in Brownsover). Independent candidate Howard Roberts gained Dunchurch from the Conservatives.

Stratford-on-Avon
The Conservatives held eight (Alcester, Aston Cantlow, Feldon, Henley-in-Arden, Kineton, Shipston-on-Stour, Southam, Stour and the Vale) and gained two from the Liberal Democrats (Bidford-on-Avon, Wellesbourne). The Liberal Democrats held three seats (Studley, both seats in Stratford South) and the Stratford First Independent Party standing in three, achieved one seat (Stratford Avenue and New Town).

Warwick
The Conservatives held six seats (Bishop's Tachbrook, Cubbington, Kenilworth Park Hill, Kenilworth St John's, Leek Wootton, Warwick South), whereas Labour held one (Leamington Willes) and gained two (Warwick North and Warwick West) from the Conservatives. The Liberal Democrats held four (Kenilworth Abbey, Leamington Milverton, and both seats in Leamington North). The Greens gained one (Leamington Brunswick) from Labour. Whitnash Residents' Association held their seat in Whitnash.

References

2013
2013 English local elections
2010s in Warwickshire